The Colossus of the North is a name for the United States typically used by those who view the country as oppressive to its southern neighbors. Popular Hispanic sentiment grew against this perceived Colossus in the early 20th century, particularly after American interference in Nicaragua and Panama for economic purposes.

The Mexican–American War and the subsequent Treaty of Guadalupe Hidalgo, in which Mexico lost roughly half of its pre-war territory to the United States, was an event that alarmed Latin America in general. While the world was well aware of the United States' rapidly growing population and economy, it was unaware that the U.S. could win such a decisive and overwhelming military victory, especially given the nation's relatively small standing army.

Notably, Great Britain, the preeminent world power of the era, was relieved that it had chosen to settle the Oregon boundary dispute with the U.S. through diplomacy. Prior to the Mexican–American War, the U.S. president at the time, James K. Polk, had pressed for expansive American claims in the Oregon Country. In hindsight, it is clear that Polk's threat of war was hardly an exaggeration.  During the course of the war, some of the more aggressive expansionists in Congress called for the U.S. to annex all of Mexico, which was within feasibility from a military standpoint but objectionable politically, primarily due to the unsettled question of slavery in the annexed territories.  If war broke out with Great Britain and a decisive military breakthrough was achieved by the U.S. to a similar extent that occurred in the Mexican War, a movement to annex "all of Canada" could very well have been pursued.

President Franklin D. Roosevelt attempted to combat this negative perception of the U.S. by implementing his Good Neighbor policy toward Latin America, particularly Central America and the Caribbean.

Anti-Americanism
United States–Central American relations
United States–Caribbean relations
Nicknames